Alicia Odilia Palomo Paíz (20 November 1919 – 1985) was a Guatemalan teacher and politician. She was the First Lady of Guatemala from 1954 to 1957. Odilia Palomo Paiz was the wife of President Carlos Castillo Armas.

She was born in Guatemala City, daughter of Herminio Palomo Mayorga and Josefina Paíz Amado. Subsequently, she married with Carlos Castillo Armas in 1933.

Odilia Palomo Paíz became First Lady after her husband was invested as President of Guatemala. She was present during the visit of Vice President Richard Nixon and his wife Pat Nixon. On July 27, 1957, she was present during the murder of her husband Carlos Castillo Armas and was the only witness to the murder. After the funeral of her husband's estate, she retired from public life, in 1976 President Fernando Romeo Lucas García decorated her with the Order Dolores Bedoya de Molina for her educational and social work. Palomo Paíz died in 1985.

References

1919 births
1985 deaths
First ladies of Guatemala
Guatemalan schoolteachers